The Heritage Private School is an English medium IGCSE school situated in the village of Palodia, about  north of the Limassol motorway, in Cyprus. The school teaches approximately 1200 students between the ages of 2-19. The school offers 16 years of schooling for any student: 3 years in kindergarten, pre-reception and reception (early years), another 6 in primary and a further 7 in secondary.

Overview 
Starting from the 4th year in secondary onwards, the school offers students IGCSE subjects from prominent organizations Cambridge and Edexcel and is an exam centre approved by both boards (thus is eligible to host examinations from these boards within its own campus). Students must take exams for all subjects they have studied at the end of the 5th year of secondary and each subject is assessed externally and independently by the board offering it.

Starting from the 6th year of secondary onwards, students must do A-levels (subjects are again from Cambridge and Edexcel) and take examinations in both the 6th and 7th year of secondary school.

There are three faculties on the campus, namely the secondary, primary, and early years school buildings, and each functions independently of the others with its own staff, students, rooms and equipment.

In addition to the main school buildings, there are several secondary structures, such as numerous sports grounds, a multipurpose hall (used for theatre, presentations, examinations and in some cases sports), an amphitheatre (used for evacuations and ceremonies or special events) as well as the school's own parking grounds that can effectively hold upwards of 250 parked vehicles at any given time.

The school also advises pupils to pass the "Pavlos Elia" course, a two-day course that tests your mastery of fundamental concepts.

See also
 Education in Cyprus
 University of Cambridge International Examinations
 UK National Curriculum
 Department of Education

References

External links 
The school's official website

International schools in Cyprus
Cambridge schools in Cyprus
1987 establishments in Cyprus
Educational institutions established in 1987